China competed in the 2008 Asian Beach Games which were held in Bali, Indonesia from October 18, 2008 to October 26, 2008.

See also
 China at the Asian Games
 China at the Olympics
 Sport in China

Nations at the 2008 Asian Beach Games
2008
Asian Beach Games